In Chinese tradition, a ghost marriage is a marriage in which one or both parties are deceased. Other forms of ghost marriage are practiced worldwide, notably in France since 1959 (see posthumous marriage; compare levirate marriage and ghost marriage in South Sudan, i.e. marriage to a living relative of the deceased). The origins of Chinese ghost marriage are largely unknown, but reports of it being practiced today can still be found.

Overview

Reasons
In traditional Chinese culture it is shameful to be the parents of an unwed daughter, and unmarried girls are often shunned from society.
For men, ghost marriages were often performed for the sake of progeny. In addition, ghost marriage for men let the family's lineage carry on. The spouse of a deceased male could adopt a child who would carry on the lineage of the man's family. Other reasons for performing ghost marriages for deceased males are dreams and séances from the spirits of the males who want to be married. Chinese tradition also says that younger brothers do not marry before their older brothers, so sometimes a Chinese ghost marriage will be performed to stay in line with this tradition.

Arrangement 
Sometimes the family of a deceased person will use a priest as a matchmaker. Other times they will leave out a red envelope with gifts and believe that the deceased person's spouse will reveal himself.

Sometimes when a woman's fiancé died, in order for her to participate in the ghost marriage, she would have to participate in the man's funeral service, which included uncomfortable mourning standards, taking a vow of celibacy, and to immediately take up residence with the man's family. There are no requirements for a man doing this but this has not been recorded.

Performance 
These ghost marriages were similar to both a wedding and a funeral. The families of the participants will exchange gifts of various sizes which can include cakes, dresses, and money.

To represent the deceased person(s) effigies made of bamboo will be used. These are clothed in what people would wear to weddings and are usually burned afterwards. Most of the rites of the marriage are actually performed in the same way regular Chinese marriages are usually performed.

Theft of female corpses
The practice leads to reported cases of female corpses being stolen. In 2017–19, it is reported that a black market of female corpses has appeared in the provinces of Shandong, Shanxi and Shaanxi. A female dead body can be sold in the range of several hundred thousands RMB for the purpose of minghun. Even corpses of married, elderly women have become targets of such illegal trade. In 2019 some graveyards in Henan province resort to CCTV cameras and concrete coffins to prevent thefts.

Types
Chinese ghost marriage was usually set up by the family of the deceased and performed for a number of reasons, including the marriage of a couple engaged before one member's death, to integrate an unmarried daughter into a patrilineage, to ensure the family line is continued, or to ensure that no younger brother is married before an elder brother.

Previously engaged
Upon the death of her fiancé, a bride could choose to go through with the wedding, in which the groom was represented by a white cockerel at the ceremony. However, some women were hesitant since this form of ghost marriage required her to participate in the funeral ritual, mourning customs (including strict dress and conduct standards), take a vow of celibacy, and immediately take up residence with his family. A groom had the option of marrying his late fiancée, with no disadvantages, but there have been no records of such weddings.

Women and ghost marriage

Providing a deceased daughter with a patrilineage

When it comes to death customs, an unmarried Chinese woman has no descendants to worship her or care for her as part of a lineage. In every household, an altar is prominently displayed with the spirit tablets of the paternal ancestors and the images of the gods. A married woman's tablet is kept at the altar of her husband's family. However, should a woman of eligible age pass away unmarried, her family is prohibited from placing her tablet on the altar of her natal home. Instead, she will be "given a temporary paper tablet, placed not on the domestic altar but in a corner near the door." Hence, the important duty of Chinese parents in marrying off their children becomes increasingly important for their daughters. Since women are only able to acquire membership in descent lines through marriage, ghost marriage became a viable solution to ensure that unmarried, deceased daughters still had "affiliation to a male descent line" and could be appropriately cared for after death.

Another death custom concerning an unmarried daughter prohibited her from dying in her natal home. Instead, a temple or "Death House" for spinsters was built or families take their daughter to a shed, empty house, or outlying buildings to die.

Living, unmarried daughters
Not only did the Chinese customs concerning death greatly burden the family, but an unmarried daughter became a source of great embarrassment and concern. In Charlotte Ikels's "Parental Perspectives on the Significance of Marriage" she reports, "Traditionally, girls who did not marry were regarded as a threat to the entire family and were not allowed to continue living at home. Even in contemporary Hong Kong, it is believed unmarried women are assumed to have psychological problems. Presumably no normal person would remain unmarried voluntarily." For girls who choose to remain unmarried, "bride-initiated spirit marriage" (or a ghost marriage initiated by a living bride) was a successful "marriage-resistance practice" that allowed them to remain single while still being integrated into a lineage. However, it did come with some negative connotations, being called a "fake spirit-marriage" or referred to as "marrying a spirit tablet", and a way to avoid marriage.

Continuing the family line
If a son died before marriage, his parents arranged a ghost marriage to provide him with progeny to continue the lineage and give him his own descendants. "A man in China does not marry so much for his own benefit as for that of the family: to continue the family name; to provide descendants to keep up the ancestral worship; and to give a daughter-in-law to his mother to wait on her and be, in general, a daughter to her." Occasionally, a live woman is taken as a wife for a dead man, but this is rare. The ceremony itself took on characteristics of both a marriage and a funeral, with the spirit of the deceased bride being "led" by a medium or priest, while her body is transferred from her grave to be laid next to her husband.

If the family was "suitably rich to tempt a [living] girl," the ghost marriage might profit them with the asset of having a daughter-in-law. Since a daughter is not considered "a potential contributor to the lineage into which she is born," but rather "it is expected that she will give the children she bears and her adult labor to the family of her husband," the wife of a deceased son would benefit her husband's family by becoming a caregiver in their home.

Once the deceased son had a wife, the family could adopt an heir, or a "grandson", to continue on the family line. The purpose of the daughter-in-law was not to produce offspring, as she was to live a chaste life, but she became the "social instrument" to enable the family to adopt. The family preferred to adopt patrilineally related male kin, usually through a brother assigning one of his own sons to the lineage of the deceased. The adoption was carried out by writing up a contract, which was then placed under the dead man's tablet. As an adopted son, his duties were to make ancestral offerings on his birth and death dates, and he was additionally "entitled to inherit his foster father's share of the family estate."

Requests from the afterworld
Ghost marriages are often set up by request of the spirit of the deceased, who, upon "finding itself without a spouse in the other world," causes misfortune for its natal family, the family of its betrothed, or for the family of the deceased's married sisters. "This usually takes the form of sickness by one or more family members. When the sickness is not cured by ordinary means, the family turns to divination and learns of the plight of the ghost through a séance."

More benignly, a spirit may appear to a family member in a dream and request a spouse. Marjorie Topley, in "Ghost Marriages Among the Singapore Chinese: A Further Note," relates the story of one 14-year-old Cantonese boy who died. A month later he appeared to his mother in a dream saying that he wished to marry a girl who had recently died in Ipoh, Perak. The son did not reveal her name; his mother used a Cantonese spirit medium and "through her the boy gave the name of the girl together with her place of birth and age, and details of her horoscope which were subsequently found to be compatible with his."

Other instances of ghost marriage
Because Chinese custom dictates that younger brothers should not marry before their elder brothers, a ghost marriage for an older, deceased brother may be arranged just before a younger brother's wedding to avoid "incurring the disfavour of his brother's ghost."
Additionally, in the days of immigration, ghost marriages were used to "cement a bond of friendship between two families." However, there have been no recent cases reported.

Arrangement
If a family wishes to arrange a ghost marriage, they may consult with a matchmaker of sorts: In a Cantonese area of Singapore "there is in fact a ghost marriage broker's sign hung up in a doorway of a Taoist priest's home. The broker announces that he is willing to undertake the search for a family which has a suitable deceased member with a favourable horoscope."

Others do not use the aid of any priest or diviner and believe that the groom the ghost-bride has chosen "[will] somehow identify himself." Typically, the family lays a red envelope (usually used for gifts of money) as bait in the middle of the road. They then take to hiding, and when the envelope is picked up by a passer-by, they come out and announce his status of being the chosen bridegroom.

Dowries and bridewealth
The exchange of bridewealth and dowries between the two families involved in a ghost marriage is quite "variable," and families may exchange both, one or the other, or even just red money packets. There is no standard amount exchanged, but several of Janice Stockard's informants reported that the groom's family provided the bride with a house. In another reported ghost marriage, the groom's family sent wedding cakes and NT $120 to the bride's family, who returned it with a dowry of a gold ring, gold necklace, several pairs of shoes, and six dresses "all fitted for the use of the groom's living wife."

Rites of the ghost marriage ceremony
In a ghost marriage, many of the typical marriage rites are observed. However, since one or more parties is deceased, they are otherwise represented, most often by effigies made of paper, bamboo, or cloth.

For instance, a ghost couple at their marriage feast, the bride and groom may be constructed of paper bodies over a bamboo frame with a papier-mâché head. On either side of them stands their respective paper servants, and the room contains many other paper effigies of products they would use in their home, such as a dressing table (complete with a mirror), a table and six stools, a money safe, a refrigerator, and trunks of paper clothes and cloth. After the marriage ceremony is complete, all of the paper belongings are burned to be sent to the spirit world to be used by the couple.

In another ceremony that married a living groom to a ghost bride, the effigy was similar, but instead constructed with a wooden backbone, arms made from newspaper, and the head of "a smiling young girl clipped from a wall calendar." Similarly, after the marriage festivities, the dummy is burned.

In both cases, the effigies wore real clothing, similar to that which is typically used in marriage ceremonies. This includes a pair of trousers, a white skirt, a red dress, with a lace outer dress.> Additionally, they were adorned with jewelry; though similar in fashion to that of a typical bride's, it was not made of real gold. If a living groom is marrying a ghost bride, he will wear black gloves instead of the typical white.

Most of the marriage ceremony and rites are performed true to Chinese custom. In fact, "the bride was always treated as though she was alive and participating in the proceedings" from being fed at the wedding feast in the morning, to being invited in and out of the cab, to being told of her arrival at the groom's house. One observable difference in a ghost marriage is that the ancestral tablet of the deceased is placed inside the effigy, so that "the bride's dummy [is] animated with the ghost that [is] to be married", and then placed with the groom's family's tablets at the end of the marriage festivities.

Popular culture 
Writer Yangsze Choo's 2013 novel used the principles of ghost marriage as its central premise. It became a New York Times best-seller, and was selected as a Best Book by Oprah.com. It later formed the basis of the Netflix-original series The Ghost Bride (TV series), which was co-directed by Malaysian directors Quek Shio-chuan and Ho Yu-hang. It starred Huang Pei-jia, Wu Kang-jen, Ludi Lin, and Kuang Tian.

Notes

References

Further reading
 
 
 

Death customs
Practices in Chinese folk religion
Marriage in Chinese culture
Posthumous marriage
Chinese ghosts